The Moldova men's national under-18 basketball team is a national basketball team of Moldova, administered by the Basketball Federation of Moldova. It represents the country in international men's under-18 basketball competitions.

The team won four medals at the FIBA U18 European Championship Division C.

FIBA U18 European Championship participations

See also
Moldova men's national basketball team
Moldova men's national under-16 basketball team
Moldova women's national under-18 basketball team

References

External links
Archived records of Moldova team participations

Basketball in Moldova
Basketball
Men's national under-18 basketball teams